Anisa Butt (born 18 January 1993) is a British-Indian television and film actress who works in Indian television and cinema. She started her career as a child artist in the television show Ishaan, which aired on Disney Channel India. She made her film debut in Shuja Ali's movie Baat Bann Gayi.

Early life 
Anisa Butt was born in London, England into an Indian Kashmiri Muslim family. Anisa graduated from University of London with a B.A. in Drama (Performance). She is a self-taught dancer and has performed dance and drama at the Royal Albert hall. She has also attended Kevin Spacey’s workshop at The Old Vic theater.

Career 

In 2010, Anisa started her career with Disney Channel India's show Ishaan as Shyla.  In 2011, she made a cameo appearance in Zindagi Na Milegi Dobara as Tanya.  She was spotted with Shahrukh Khan in an advertisement for Navratna Seeti Bajao, directed by Rajkumar Hirani.

In 2013, she has made a small appearance in Yeh Jawaani Hai Deewani with Ranbir Kapoor and Deepika Padukone in the lead roles. She made her film debut with Baat Bann Gayi in the lead role opposite Ali Fazal. The film also co-starred Gulshan Grover and Amrita Raichand and was released on 11 October 2013.

In 2017, she had made a small appearance in Half Girlfriend with Arjun Kapoor and Shraddha Kapoor in the lead roles.

Filmography

Films

Web series

References

External links

 
 

1993 births
Living people
British people of Indian descent
British people of Kashmiri descent
British Muslims
English people of Indian descent
English people of Kashmiri descent
English Muslims
British emigrants to India
English emigrants to India
Actresses from London
Alumni of the University of London
English child actresses
English film actresses
English television actresses
Actresses in Hindi cinema